Cunard usually refers to Cunard Line, a shipping company founded by Samuel Cunard.

Cunard may also refer to:

 Cunard Building in Liverpool, the former headquarters of Cunard Line
 Cunard (surname)
 Cunard (coachbuilder), London-based supplier of car bodies.

See also
Cunarder may mean:
 Any ship owned by the Cunard Line
 A set of boat trains which took passengers to and from ship ports.